Moloney may refer to:

Moloney (surname), people with the surname Moloney
Moloney (TV series), 1996–97 American television police drama

See also
Maloney
Moloney's Mimic Bat